Xtreme Skyflyer (known as RipCord at Carowinds ) is a Skycoaster at several Cedar Fair parks. The Carowinds and Kings Island models opened in 1995, while the Canada's Wonderland and Kings Dominion models opened in 1996 followed by California's Great America which opened their model in 1997. In order to ride the attraction, guests must pay an extra fee. As of 2020, this attraction changed from its 48" height restriction to 42" across all parks.

Structure 
Xtreme Skyflyer is mainly made up of 5 parts. The first part is the "arch". This is where the cables holding the riders are attached to. The second parts are the two towers which hold the lift cables. When riders are ready to release the cable, they are at the top of either tower. The third part is the scissor lift which brings up and down riders from the cables. The fourth parts are the cables that hold the riders during the entire cycle. The final part is the lift cable which brings riders to the top of the ride giving riders the maximum experience.

Ride experience
Riders first step onto a scissor lift, where they are raised into the loading position. Operators then hook the riders onto a cable that brings the riders to the top of the tower and a cable that holds the riders during the free-fall. Once the riders are securely attached to the cable and the operators say it is safe to operate, the scissor lift is brought down and the riders are pulled to the top of the tower. Once the riders reach the top, they must wait until the operator at the bottom says to "pull the cord". The operator will usually say "tower one / two: 3, 2, 1, fly." At this point, the rider at the far right (unless there is a single rider) must pull the cord releasing them from the lift cable. During the first drop, riders experience about 3 to 4 seconds of free-falling. After about 10 swings, an operator will lift a hydraulic cable with a loop at the top which then a rider will have to grab and hold on to. After grabbing the cable, the riders will come to a stop just above the scissor lift. The next riders will step onto the lift where the previous riders will be unloaded and they will be attached to the lift cable where the cycle begins again. One cycle can last anywhere between 3 and 5 minutes.

References 

Amusement rides introduced in 1995
Amusement rides introduced in 1996
Amusement rides introduced in 1997
Carowinds
California's Great America
Cedar Fair attractions